Liesl Ischia is a diver who represented Australia at the 2002 Commonwealth Games in Manchester, England. Liesl attended Carey Baptist Grammar School in Hawthorn, Melbourne, holding the current Associated Public Schools of Victoria Diving records for girls  as well as various junior APS athletic records. She won bronze at the World Junior Championships in Calgary, Canada, 2000. Having retired from diving in 2006, she studied medicine at the University of Sydney and is currently a doctor at the Royal Prince Alfred Hospital.  She is the sister of Australian Representative 800m runner Joseph Ischia.

References

Sources 
http://www.abc.net.au/commonwealthgames/2002/nations/team_australia.htm
https://web.archive.org/web/20090816085047/http://www.vis.org.au/downloads/Pinnacle57.pdf

Divers at the 2002 Commonwealth Games
Living people
Year of birth missing (living people)
Australian female divers
People educated at Carey Baptist Grammar School
Commonwealth Games competitors for Australia